A timeline of events in the history of thermodynamics.

Before 1800 
 1650 – Otto von Guericke builds the first vacuum pump
 1660 – Robert Boyle experimentally discovers Boyle's Law, relating the pressure and volume of a gas (published 1662)
 1665 – Robert Hooke published his book Micrographia, which contained the statement: "Heat being nothing else but a very brisk and vehement agitation of the parts of a body."
 1667 – J. J. Becher puts forward a theory of combustion involving combustible earth in his book Physica subterranea (see Phlogiston theory).
 1676–1689 – Gottfried Leibniz develops the concept of vis viva, a limited version of the conservation of energy
 1679 – Denis Papin designed a steam digester which inspired the development of the piston-and-cylinder steam engine.
 1694–1734 – Georg Ernst Stahl names Becher's combustible earth as phlogiston and develops the theory
 1698 – Thomas Savery patents an early steam engine
 1702 – Guillaume Amontons introduces the concept of absolute zero, based on observations of gases
 1738 – Daniel Bernoulli publishes Hydrodynamica, initiating the kinetic theory
 1749 – Émilie du Châtelet, in her French translation and commentary on Newton's Philosophiae Naturalis Principia Mathematica, derives the conservation of energy from the first principles of Newtonian mechanics.
 1761 – Joseph Black discovers that ice absorbs heat without changing its temperature when melting
 1772 – Black's student Daniel Rutherford discovers nitrogen, which he calls phlogisticated air, and together they explain the results in terms of the phlogiston theory
 1776 – John Smeaton publishes a paper on experiments related to power, work, momentum, and kinetic energy, supporting the conservation of energy
 1777 – Carl Wilhelm Scheele distinguishes heat transfer by thermal radiation from that by convection and conduction
 1783 – Antoine Lavoisier discovers oxygen and develops an explanation for combustion; in his paper "Réflexions sur le phlogistique", he deprecates the phlogiston theory and proposes a caloric theory
 1784 – Jan Ingenhousz describes Brownian motion of charcoal particles on water
 1791 – Pierre Prévost shows that all bodies radiate heat, no matter how hot or cold they are
 1798 – Count Rumford (Benjamin Thompson) publishes his paper An Experimental Enquiry Concerning the Source of the Heat which is Excited by Friction detailing measurements of the frictional heat generated in boring cannons and develops the idea that heat is a form of kinetic energy; his measurements are inconsistent with caloric theory, but are also sufficiently imprecise as to leave room for doubt.

1800–1847 
 1802 – Joseph Louis Gay-Lussac publishes Charles's law, discovered (but unpublished) by Jacques Charles around 1787; this shows the dependency between temperature and volume. Gay-Lussac also formulates the law relating temperature with pressure (the pressure law, or Gay-Lussac's law)
 1804 – Sir John Leslie observes that a matte black surface radiates heat more effectively than a polished surface, suggesting the importance of black-body radiation
 1805 – William Hyde Wollaston defends the conservation of energy in On the Force of Percussion
 1808 – John Dalton defends caloric theory in A New System of Chemistry and describes how it combines with matter, especially gases; he proposes that the heat capacity of gases varies inversely with atomic weight
 1810 – Sir John Leslie freezes water to ice artificially
 1813 – Peter Ewart supports the idea of the conservation of energy in his paper On the measure of moving force; the paper strongly influences Dalton and his pupil, James Joule
 1819 – Pierre Louis Dulong and Alexis Thérèse Petit give the Dulong-Petit law for the specific heat capacity of a crystal
 1820 – John Herapath develops some ideas in the kinetic theory of gases but mistakenly associates temperature with molecular momentum rather than kinetic energy; his work receives little attention other than from Joule
 1822 – Joseph Fourier formally introduces the use of dimensions for physical quantities in his Théorie Analytique de la Chaleur
 1822 – Marc Seguin writes to John Herschel supporting the conservation of energy and kinetic theory
 1824 – Sadi Carnot analyzes the efficiency of steam engines using caloric theory; he develops the notion of a reversible process and, in postulating that no such thing exists in nature, lays the foundation for the second law of thermodynamics, and initiating the science of thermodynamics
 1827 – Robert Brown discovers the Brownian motion of pollen and dye particles in water 
 1831 – Macedonio Melloni demonstrates that black-body radiation can be reflected, refracted, and polarised in the same way as light
 1834 – Émile Clapeyron popularises Carnot's work through a graphical and analytic formulation. He also combined Boyle's Law, Charles's Law, and Gay-Lussac's Law to produce a Combined Gas Law.  PV/T = k 
 1841 – Julius Robert von Mayer, an amateur scientist, writes a paper on the conservation of energy, but his lack of academic training leads to its rejection
 1842 – Mayer makes a connection between work, heat, and the human metabolism based on his observations of blood made while a ship's surgeon; he calculates the mechanical equivalent of heat
 1842 – William Robert Grove demonstrates the thermal dissociation of molecules into their constituent atoms, by showing that steam can be disassociated into oxygen and hydrogen, and the process reversed
 1843 – John James Waterston fully expounds the kinetic theory of gases, but according to D Levermore "there is no evidence that any physical scientist read the book; perhaps it was overlooked because of its misleading title, Thoughts on the Mental Functions."
 1843 – James Joule experimentally finds the mechanical equivalent of heat 
 1845 – Henri Victor Regnault added Avogadro's Law to the Combined Gas Law  to produce the Ideal Gas Law. PV = nRT
 1846 – Grove publishes an account of the general theory of the conservation of energy in On The Correlation of Physical Forces 
 1847 – Hermann von Helmholtz publishes a definitive statement of the conservation of energy, the first law of thermodynamics

1848–1899 
 1848 – William Thomson extends the concept of absolute zero from gases to all substances
 1849 – William John Macquorn Rankine calculates the correct relationship between saturated vapour pressure and temperature using his hypothesis of molecular vortices
 1850 – Rankine uses his vortex theory to establish accurate relationships between the temperature, pressure, and density of gases, and expressions for the latent heat of evaporation of a liquid; he accurately predicts the surprising fact that the apparent specific heat of saturated steam will be negative
 1850 – Rudolf Clausius coined the term "entropy" (das Wärmegewicht, symbolized S) to denote heat lost or turned into waste. ("Wärmegewicht" translates literally as "heat-weight"; the corresponding English term stems from the Greek τρέπω, "I turn".)
 1850 – Clausius gives the first clear joint statement of the first and second law of thermodynamics, abandoning the caloric theory, but preserving Carnot's principle
 1851 – Thomson gives an alternative statement of the second law
 1852 – Joule and Thomson demonstrate that a rapidly expanding gas cools, later named the Joule–Thomson effect or Joule–Kelvin effect
 1854 – Helmholtz puts forward the idea of the heat death of the universe
 1854 – Clausius establishes the importance of dQ/T (Clausius's theorem), but does not yet name the quantity
 1854 – Rankine introduces his thermodynamic function, later identified as entropy
 1856 – August Krönig publishes an account of the kinetic theory of gases, probably after reading Waterston's work
 1857 – Clausius gives a modern and compelling account of the kinetic theory of gases in his On the nature of motion called heat
 1859 – James Clerk Maxwell discovers the distribution law of molecular velocities
 1859 – Gustav Kirchhoff shows that energy emission from a black body is a function of only temperature and frequency
 1862 – "Disgregation", a precursor of entropy, was defined in 1862 by Clausius as the magnitude of the degree of separation of molecules of a body
 1865 – Clausius introduces the modern macroscopic concept of entropy
 1865 – Josef Loschmidt applies Maxwell's theory to estimate the number-density of molecules in gases, given observed gas viscosities.
 1867 – Maxwell asks whether Maxwell's demon could reverse irreversible processes
 1870 – Clausius proves the scalar virial theorem
 1872 – Ludwig Boltzmann states the Boltzmann equation for the temporal development of distribution functions in phase space, and publishes his H-theorem
 1873 - Johannes Diderik van der Waals formulates his equation of state
 1874 – Thomson formally states the second law of thermodynamics
 1876 – Josiah Willard Gibbs publishes the first of two papers (the second appears in 1878) which discuss phase equilibria, statistical ensembles, the free energy as the driving force behind chemical reactions, and chemical thermodynamics in general.
 1876 – Loschmidt criticises Boltzmann's H theorem as being incompatible with microscopic reversibility (Loschmidt's paradox).
 1877 – Boltzmann states the relationship between entropy and probability
 1879 – Jožef Stefan observes that the total radiant flux from a blackbody is proportional to the fourth power of its temperature and states the Stefan–Boltzmann law
 1884 – Boltzmann derives the Stefan–Boltzmann blackbody radiant flux law from thermodynamic considerations
 1888 – Henri-Louis Le Chatelier states his principle that the response of a chemical system perturbed from equilibrium will be to counteract the perturbation
 1889 – Walther Nernst relates the voltage of electrochemical cells to their chemical thermodynamics via the Nernst equation
 1889 – Svante Arrhenius introduces the idea of activation energy for chemical reactions, giving the Arrhenius equation
 1893 – Wilhelm Wien discovers the displacement law for a blackbody's maximum specific intensity

1900–1944 
 1900 – Max Planck suggests that light may be emitted in discrete frequencies, giving his law of black-body radiation
 1905 – Albert Einstein, in the first of his miracle year papers, argues that the reality of quanta would explain the photoelectric effect
 1905 – Einstein mathematically analyzes Brownian motion as a result of random molecular motion in his paper On the movement of small particles suspended in a stationary liquid demanded by the molecular-kinetic theory of heat
 1906 – Nernst presents a formulation of the third law of thermodynamics
 1907 – Einstein uses quantum theory to estimate the heat capacity of an Einstein solid
 1909 – Constantin Carathéodory develops an axiomatic system of thermodynamics 
 1910 – Einstein and Marian Smoluchowski find the Einstein–Smoluchowski formula for the attenuation coefficient due to density fluctuations in a gas
 1911 – Paul Ehrenfest and Tatjana Ehrenfest–Afanassjewa publish their classical review on the statistical mechanics of Boltzmann, Begriffliche Grundlagen der statistischen Auffassung in der Mechanik
 1912 – Peter Debye gives an improved heat capacity estimate by allowing low-frequency phonons
 1916 – Sydney Chapman and David Enskog systematically develop the kinetic theory of gases.
 1916 – Einstein considers the thermodynamics of atomic spectral lines and predicts stimulated emission
 1919 – James Jeans discovers that the dynamical constants of motion determine the distribution function for a system of particles
 1920 – Meghnad Saha states his ionization equation
 1923 – Debye and Erich Hückel publish a statistical treatment of the dissociation of electrolytes
 1924 – Satyendra Nath Bose introduces Bose–Einstein statistics, in a paper translated by Einstein
 1926 – Enrico Fermi and Paul Dirac introduce Fermi–Dirac statistics
 1927 – John von Neumann introduces the density matrix representation, establishing quantum statistical mechanics
 1928 – John B. Johnson discovers Johnson noise in a resistor 
 1928 – Harry Nyquist derives the fluctuation-dissipation theorem, a relationship to explain Johnson noise in a resistor 
 1931 – Lars Onsager publishes his groundbreaking paper deriving the Onsager reciprocal relations
 1938 – Anatoly Vlasov proposes the Vlasov equation for a correct dynamical description of ensembles of particles with collective long range interaction.
 1939 – Nikolay Krylov and Nikolay Bogolyubov give the first consistent microscopic derivation of the Fokker–Planck equation in the single scheme of classical and quantum mechanics 
 1942 – Joseph L. Doob states his theorem on Gauss–Markov processes
 1944 – Lars Onsager gives an analytic solution to the 2-dimensional Ising model, including its phase transition

1945–present 
 1945–1946 – Nikolay Bogoliubov develops a general method for a microscopic derivation of kinetic equations for classical statistical systems using BBGKY hierarchy
 1947 – Nikolay Bogoliubov and Kirill Gurov extend this method for a microscopic derivation of kinetic equations for quantum statistical systems
 1948 – Claude Elwood Shannon establishes information theory
 1957 – Aleksandr Solomonovich Kompaneets derives his Compton scattering Fokker–Planck equation
 1957 – Ryogo Kubo derives the first of the Green-Kubo relations for linear transport coefficients 
 1957 – Edwin T. Jaynes publishes two papers detailing the MaxEnt interpretation of thermodynamics from information theory 
 1960–1965 – Dmitry Zubarev develops the method of non-equilibrium statistical operator, which becomes a classical tool in the statistical theory of non-equilibrium processes
 1972 – Jacob Bekenstein suggests that black holes have an entropy proportional to their surface area
 1974 – Stephen Hawking predicts that black holes will radiate particles with a black-body spectrum which can cause black hole evaporation
1977 – Ilya Prigogine wins the Nobel prize for his work on dissipative structures in thermodynamic systems far from equilibrium.  The importation and dissipation of energy could reverse the 2nd law of thermodynamics

See also 
 Timeline of heat engine technology
 History of physics
 History of thermodynamics
 Timeline of information theory
 List of textbooks in thermodynamics and statistical mechanics

References 

History of thermodynamics
Thermodynamics, statistical mechanics, and random processes